The Drucker–Prager yield criterion is a pressure-dependent model for determining whether a material has failed or undergone plastic yielding.  The criterion was introduced to deal with the plastic deformation of soils.  It and its many variants have been applied to rock, concrete, polymers, foams, and other pressure-dependent materials.

The Drucker–Prager yield criterion has the form

The constants  are determined from experiments.

In terms of the equivalent stress (or von Mises stress) and the hydrostatic (or mean) stress, the Drucker–Prager criterion can be expressed as

where  is the equivalent stress,  is the hydrostatic stress, and
 are material constants.  The Drucker–Prager yield criterion expressed in Haigh–Westergaard coordinates is

The Drucker–Prager yield surface is a smooth version of the Mohr–Coulomb yield surface.

Expressions for A and B 
The Drucker–Prager model can be written in terms of the principal stresses as

If  is the yield stress in uniaxial tension, the Drucker–Prager criterion implies

If  is the yield stress in uniaxial compression, the Drucker–Prager criterion implies

Solving these two equations gives

Uniaxial asymmetry ratio 
Different uniaxial yield stresses in tension and in compression are predicted by the Drucker–Prager model.  The uniaxial asymmetry ratio for the Drucker–Prager model is

Expressions in terms of cohesion and friction angle 
Since the Drucker–Prager yield surface is a smooth version of the Mohr–Coulomb yield surface, it is often expressed in terms of the cohesion and the angle of internal friction that are used to describe the Mohr–Coulomb yield surface.

If the Drucker–Prager yield surface middle circumscribes the Mohr–Coulomb yield surface then

If the Drucker–Prager yield surface inscribes the Mohr–Coulomb yield surface then

{| class="toccolours collapsible collapsed" width="90%" style="text-align:left"
|-
|The expression for the Mohr–Coulomb yield criterion in Haigh–Westergaard space is

or,

The Drucker–Prager yield criterion expressed in Haigh–Westergaard coordinates is

Comparing equations (1.1) and (1.2), we have

On the other hand, if the Drucker–Prager surface inscribes the Mohr–Coulomb surface, then matching the two surfaces at  gives

|}

Drucker–Prager model for polymers 
The Drucker–Prager model has been used to model polymers such as polyoxymethylene and polypropylene.   For polyoxymethylene the yield stress is a linear function of the pressure.  However,  polypropylene shows a quadratic pressure-dependence of the yield stress.

Drucker–Prager model for foams 
For foams, the GAZT model uses

Extensions of the isotropic Drucker–Prager model 
The Drucker–Prager criterion can also be expressed in the alternative form

Deshpande–Fleck yield criterion or isotropic foam yield criterion 
The Deshpande–Fleck yield criterion for foams has the form given in above equation.  The parameters   for the Deshpande–Fleck criterion are

Anisotropic Drucker–Prager yield criterion 
An anisotropic form of the Drucker–Prager yield criterion is the Liu–Huang–Stout yield criterion.  This yield criterion is an extension of the generalized Hill yield criterion and has the form

The coefficients  are 

where

The Drucker yield criterion 
The Drucker–Prager criterion should not be confused with the earlier Drucker criterion  which is independent of the pressure.  The Drucker yield criterion has the form

For ,  where  is the yield stress in uniaxial tension.

Anisotropic Drucker Criterion 
An anisotropic version of the Drucker yield criterion is the Cazacu–Barlat (CZ) yield criterion  which has the form

where  are generalized forms of the deviatoric stress and are defined as

Cazacu–Barlat yield criterion for plane stress 
For thin sheet metals, the state of stress can be approximated as plane stress.  In that case the Cazacu–Barlat yield criterion reduces to its two-dimensional version with

For thin sheets of metals and alloys, the parameters of the Cazacu–Barlat yield criterion are

See also 

Yield surface
Yield (engineering)
Plasticity (physics)
Material failure theory
Daniel C. Drucker
William Prager

References 

Plasticity (physics)
Soil mechanics
Solid mechanics
Yield criteria